Stephen Metcalf or Metcalfe may refer to:

Stephen Metcalf (writer), writer and critic-at-large for Slate
Stephen Metcalfe (politician) (born 1966), British politician
Stephen Metcalfe (screenwriter) (fl. 2002–2015), American film director and screenwriter
Stephen A. Metcalf (1927–2014), British missionary

See also
Steve Metcalf (fl. 1998–2004), American lobbyist and former politician from North Carolina
Metcalf (surname)
Metcalfe (surname)